The Sarajevo Street Art Festival is an annual street art festival held in Sarajevo, Bosnia and Herzegovina. It is held in July of every year and lasts for three days. Each year's edition is made up of numerous street performances, the creation of a new street art quarter in the city, concerts, the painting of large murals and the showcasing of other creative art forms.  The final day of the festival is dedicated to children and entails stage music, theatrical and gymnastics workshops, jugglers and street magicians.

References

External links
 Official website

2015 establishments in Bosnia and Herzegovina
Festivals established in 2015
July events
Tourist attractions in Sarajevo
Annual events in Bosnia and Herzegovina
Art festivals
Street art
Festivals in Sarajevo
Arts in Sarajevo